Robert Llewellyn Sumwalt III (born June 30, 1956) is an American academic, aviator, government official and writer. He was a board member of the National Transportation Safety Board for over 15 years, from August 2006 to June 30, 2021, serving as the agency's chairman from 2017 to 2021. He currently serves as the executive director of Embry-Riddle's Center for Aviation and Aerospace Safety.

Education
He holds a Bachelor of Science degree from the University of South Carolina and a Master of Aeronautical Science (with Distinction) from Embry–Riddle Aeronautical University, specializing in Aviation/Aerospace Safety Systems and Human Factors Aviation Systems.

Career
Prior to coming to the board, Sumwalt was a pilot for 32 years, including 24 years as an airline pilot with Piedmont Airlines and US Airways. After his airline career, he joined SCANA, a Fortune 500 energy company, where he managed its corporate aviation department. He logged over 14,000 flight hours and earned type ratings in five aircraft.

Sumwalt worked on special assignment to the US Airways Flight Safety Department where he was involved in the development of numerous airline-safety programs. He served on the US Airways Flight Operational Quality Assurance (FOQA) Monitoring Team.

Sumwalt served as an air safety representative for Air Line Pilots Association (ALPA) for 17 years where he chaired ALPA's Human Factors and Training Group. He was a co-founder of that organization's Critical Incident Response Program, which provides guidance to airline personnel involved in traumatic events such as accidents.

From 1991 to 1999, Sumwalt conducted aviation-safety research as a consultant to NASA's Aviation Safety Reporting System, where he studied flight-crew human factors.

Sumwalt co-authored a book on aircraft accidents and he wrote chapters pertaining to aircraft accident investigation in two books. He has written extensively on aviation-safety matters, having published over 90 articles and papers.

In 2003, Sumwalt joined the faculty of the University of Southern California's Aviation Safety and Security Program, where he was the primary human-factors instructor.

He was sworn in as the 37th member of the National Transportation Safety Board on August 21, 2006, whereupon President George W. Bush designated him as vice chairman of the board for a two-year term. In November 2011, President Barack Obama reappointed Sumwalt to an additional five-year term. In March 2017, President Donald Trump reappointed Sumwalt to a five-year term expiring on December 31, 2021 and designated him as Vice Chairman for a term of two years. President Trump subsequently nominated Sumwalt to be NTSB chairman, and in August 2017, the U.S. Senate confirmed Sumwalt to be NTSB's 14th chairman. In 2019, President Trump again nominated him for Chairman of the NTSB. He was reconfirmed by the U.S. Senate in July 2019 for a three-year term as Chairman. He succeeded Christopher A. Hart in this role.

While on the board, he was an advocate for improving safety in all modes of transportation, including teen-driver safety, impaired driving, distractions in transportation, and several rail-safety initiatives.

In 2018 while discussing Air Canada Flight 759, Sumwalt described NOTAMs as "a bunch of garbage that nobody pays any attention to". This led to an initiative to reform the NOTAM system.

Sumwalt retired from chairmanship and membership of NTSB on June 30, 2021. In addition to his current role with Embry-Riddle, Sumwalt is a safety analyst with CBS News and volunteer board member of the Alliance for Innovation and Infrastructure.

Honors
In recognition of his contributions to the aviation industry, in September 2021, Sumwalt was awarded the Flight Safety Foundation - Boeing Aviation Safety Lifetime Achievement Award. He also received the Flight Safety Foundation's Laura Taber Barbour Award in 2003 and ALPA's Air Safety Award in 2005. He is a 2009 inductee into the South Carolina Aviation Hall of Fame.
In recognition of his accomplishments, Sumwalt was awarded an honorary Doctor in Science degree from the University of South Carolina and an Honorary Doctorate Degree from Embry-Riddle Aeronautical University.

Publications

See also

 List of Embry–Riddle Aeronautical University alumni
 List of University of South Carolina people
 List of University of Southern California people

References

External links
 Biography at National Transportation Safety Board
 
 

1950s births
20th-century American non-fiction writers
21st-century American non-fiction writers
American aviators
American aviation writers
American male non-fiction writers
Aviation safety
Chairman of the National Transportation Safety Board
Embry–Riddle Aeronautical University alumni
George W. Bush administration personnel
Living people
Obama administration personnel
University of South Carolina alumni
University of Southern California faculty
US Airways Group
Commercial aviators
Trump administration personnel
20th-century American male writers
21st-century American male writers